Thiyagarayanagar is the legislative assembly constituency located in the southern part of Chennai district of the Indian state of Tamil Nadu. Its State Assembly Constituency number is 24. It is a part of Chennai South parliamentary constituency during national elections. Thiyagarayanagar is in existence since 1957 election. It currently covers T. Nagar and adjacent localities, such as Pondy Bazaar, Kodambakkam, Ashok Nagar, KK Nagar, MGR Nagar, Vadapalani and West Mambalam. It is one of the 234 State Legislative Assembly Constituencies in Tamil Nadu.

Madras State

Tamil Nadu

Election results

2021

2016

2011

2006

2001

1996

1991

1989

1984

1980

1977

1971

1967

1962

1957

References 

 

Assembly constituencies of Tamil Nadu
Chennai district